The Aer Lualdi L.57 was a prototype Italian helicopter, a further refinement of Lualdi's ES 53 and L.55 designs.

The aircraft featured a larger main rotor than its predecessors, a fibreglass tail rotor, and an autopilot.

1950s Italian civil utility aircraft
1950s Italian helicopters
Single-engined piston helicopters